Shanta Kumar  twice became Chief Minister of Himachal Pradesh. First time he was chief minister from 22 June 1977 to 14 February 1980. Second time he was chief minister from 5 March 1990 to 15 December 1992.Here are names of the members of his second term ministry:

Cabinet ministers
 Shanta Kumar-Chief minister
 Radha Raman Shastri
 Kishori Lal
 Jagdev Chand
 Kunj Lal Thakur
 Nagin Chandra Pal
 Roop Singh

See also
 Shanta Kumar ministry (1977–80)

References

1990s in Himachal Pradesh
1990 establishments in Himachal Pradesh
Shanta Kumar 2
Shanta Kumar 02
1992 disestablishments in India
Cabinets established in 1990
Cabinets disestablished in 1992